U.S. Route 82 in Alabama runs northwest to southeast across the northwestern and central Alabama for . The route enters from Mississippi east of Columbus, Mississippi and exits into Georgia across the Chattahoochee River at Eufaula.

Route description

Throughout Alabama, US 82 is paired with unsigned State Route 6 (SR 6). The highway enters the state east of Columbus, Mississippi, and bears southeast towards Northport and Tuscaloosa, where it crosses over I-20 and I-59 south of town. It is known in West Alabama as McFarland Boulevard, in memory of Ward Wharton McFarland, a political, business, and civic leader who died in 1979. After leaving Tuscaloosa, the route continues southeast, passing through the cities of Brent, Centreville, and Maplesville en route to Prattville, on the northern edge of the Montgomery metropolitan area. This approximately  drive goes through some of the most rural areas of the state, much of it two lanes with the exception of the section from Tuscaloosa to Centreville. Upon arriving in Prattville, it runs concurrently with I-65, with which it goes through downtown Montgomery with (also junctioning with the current southern terminus of I-85), and splits off to the east south of downtown. After leaving Montgomery, the route continues southeast through Union Springs and Midway en route to Eufaula, on the Alabama–Georgia state line, where it junctions with US 431. The route then crosses over the Chattahoochee River into Georgetown, Georgia, over Lake Eufaula.

History

U.S. Route 82 was first designated within the state of Alabama in June of 1934. At the time, it ran from the Mississippi border to U.S. Route 11 in Tuscaloosa. In the summer of 1948, US 82 was extended across the state along its current route and into Georgia.

Major intersections

References

 Alabama
Transportation in Pickens County, Alabama
Transportation in Tuscaloosa County, Alabama
Transportation in Bibb County, Alabama
Transportation in Chilton County, Alabama
Transportation in Autauga County, Alabama
Transportation in Montgomery County, Alabama
Transportation in Bullock County, Alabama
Transportation in Barbour County, Alabama